Stacy Tessler Lindau is an American gynecologist and practicing OB-GYN. She is a Professor of Obstetrics and Gynecology and Medicine-Geriatrics at the University of Chicago and director of the Program in Integrative Sexual Medicine at the University of Chicago Medical Center.

Early life and education
Tessler Lindau was born to parents Martin and Sandra Tessler in Detroit, Michigan. She earned her Bachelor of Arts degree from the University of Michigan, her Master's degree from the University of Chicago, and her medical degree from Brown University. While enrolled in medical school, Tessler Lindau was the recipient of the Leah Dickstein Award from the Association of Women Psychiatrists as "a U.S. medical student who displays a high degree of excellence in creativity and leadership."

Career
Upon completing her bachelor's degree, Tessler Lindau worked at Wall Street Journal Television, a division of Dow Jones & Company, Inc, and received a Health Innovators Fellowship at the Aspen Global Leadership Network. She subsequently joined the faculty at the University of Chicago Medical Center in 2002. As an assistant professor of obstetrics and gynecology and of medicine-geriatrics, she led the first comprehensive national survey of sexual attitudes, behaviors and problems among older adults in the United States. She also studied the quality of sexual education in Illinois public schools and found that one out of three teachers failed to provide students with a comprehensive education. In 2008, Tessler Lindau found that older American adults were at a higher risk for drug interactions due to intense therapy for chronic illness and improved access to medications due to Medicare.

Tessler Lindau continued to study sexual health in adults and was the lead author of a study that found over 40% of women who survived breast and gynecologic cancers wanted medical help for their sexual issues but chose not to pursue it. In a study published in the journal Cancer, she wrote that cancer survivors were affected by both physical and psychological issues after cancer treatments including pain, dryness, loss of desire, difficulty with arousal and orgasm, and changes in body appearance due to treatments.

In 2012, Tessler Lindau's laboratory received a $5.9 million award from the Center for Medicare and Medicaid Innovation to develop technology linking patients to community services. Using this funding, she developed NowPow, a "personalized community referral platform for every need and every person." Tessler Lindau requested the assistance of Rachel Kohler to help lead NowPow and together they expanded its operations into a 90-person startup supporting about 24,000 care professionals. Prior to the implementation of NowPow, it went through three years of studying which resulted in a digital referral platform called CommunityRx. The program was expected to assist 200,000 people in Illinois be linked with up-to-date information about community-based services and resources. In 2017, Tessler Lindau and Kohler began partnering with NYC Health + Hospitals who wished to use CommunityRx to address concerns regarding food and housing insecurities amongst patients.

References

External links

Living people
American gynecologists
University of Michigan alumni
University of Chicago alumni
University of Chicago faculty
People from Bloomfield Hills, Michigan
Year of birth missing (living people)
Alpert Medical School alumni